Eisenhower Senior High School (EHS) is one of three public high schools and is located in west Lawton, Oklahoma. It was the second high school built in Lawton, Oklahoma in the early 1960s.

It is situated on a campus which contains Eisenhower Elementary, Eisenhower Middle School, 400 meter field and track zone, football and soccer fields, tennis courts, large parking areas, and other open areas.

History
Eisenhower High School is named after Dwight David "Ike" Eisenhower, who was the 34th President of the United States and supreme military commander of Allied forces in the European Theater during World War II.

Eisenhower High School opened in September 1962 housing 700 students in a building containing 48 rooms. In May 1964, an auditorium was completed; and in 1965, the northwest wing was completed, providing the school with an additional 45 rooms and housing a total of 1,900 students. In the 2003–2004 school year, EHS had 1,380 students and 112 faculty. Its library contains approximately 16,000 volumes, not including textbooks.

In 2006, construction began on a new wing that housed thirty classrooms, and in 2007, the courtyard was closed and a new cafeteria was built. The staff as of today locks all doors to the courtyard unless lunch is in session. As of the 2007–2008 school year, Eisenhower (commonly referred to by both its own students and the students of rival schools as IKE) has a student body of approximately 1400 students, a number that has increased greatly from the usual average of 1,100 due to freshmen being incorporated into the student body.

Academics
Eisenhower is also well known for academics. Eisenhower has represented the state of Oklahoma for ten years in the Academic Decathlon Nationals competition, having won the state competition for an entire decade. Students at Eisenhower go on to attend many of the most famous universities in the country, while many stay local to attend Cameron University in Lawton. Ike students also attend the University of Oklahoma in Norman, Oklahoma State University in Stillwater, University of Central Oklahoma in Edmond, Southwestern Oklahoma State University in Weatherford, Southeastern Oklahoma State University in Durant or join the military, or the Lawton Public Schools itself.

Athletics
Eisenhower High School is well known for its excellence in sports. Most notably, the Eagles were 5A State and National Champions in football in 1990 as well as several other teams over the last 25 years. Many IKE athletes move on to play with many Big 12 Conference teams, such as Oklahoma State University, University of Oklahoma, University of Texas, and other smaller nationwide colleges and within the state of Oklahoma.

In 2007, Eisenhower Eagles men's basketball team were 6A State Finalist with a record of 24-3 under Head Coach Bruce Harrington and Assistant Coaches Brad Cooksey and Michael Parks. Additionally within 2007, the Eisenhower Eagles Varsity men's bowling team progressed all the way to the state finals, where they won and were crowned the 2007 Oklahoma High School Varsity Boys Bowling Team. Additionally, the men's bowling team also were crowned state champions in 2016. The Women's bowling team has been on a dynasty run winning the state title the past 6 years.

Cheerleading has also been a major sport with their recent win of 6th in the 5A state competition in Tulsa, Oklahoma under Allison Wyatt and Cheryl Zimmerman. Cheerleading will be something to watch in the years to come.

Championship Titles
 Oklahoma 5A
Boys basketball 2015
 Cheerleading: 2002
 Cheerleading COED: 2000
 Girls Basketball: 1984, 1985  
 Girls Cross Country: 1991
 Girls Golf: 2000
 Girls Tennis:  1991 (Doubles)
 Football: 1990
 Boys Track: 1985, 1990, 1991, 1993
 300 Hurdles State Meet Record: 1993
 Oklahoma 4A
 Boys Track: 1978, 1980
 Oklahoma 2A
 Boys Cross Country: 1965
 Boys Track: 1968
 Oklahoma A
 Boys Cross Country: 1964
–—

Clubs and Organizations
Eisenhower High School sponsors the following clubs and organizations for the student body: Anime, African American, Art, Band, BBB (Blue Body Brigade), BIB (Babes in Blue), Choir, Decathlon, Drama, FCA (Fellowship of Christian Athletes), FCCLA (Family, Career and Community Leaders of America), Fencing, FFA (Future Farmers of America), Geography, National Honor Society, Key Club, Media, Military Child, The Patriot Newspaper, Native American, Orchestra, JROTC (Junior Reserve Officers' Training Corps), Spanish, Step Team, Student Council, Website Staff, The Talon Yearbook Staff.

Notable alumni
Ray Austin-Former NFL play
Larry Birdine - NFL player
Martin Chase - Former NFL player
Nick Cole - NFL player
Steven Drozd - Member of the rock band, The Flaming Lips. (Class of 1987)
Vickie Gates, IFBB professional bodybuilder (Class of 1980)
Marcus Henry - NFL player
Koyie Hill - MLB player
Butch Huskey - MLB player
Jason Rouser - Olympic gold medalist, track and field
Edward Weisenburger - Class of 1979.  Bishop of the Roman Catholic Diocese of Tucson, Arizona.
Dr. Craig H. Rabb Class of 1979. Professor and Chair of the Department of Neurological Surgery at the Creighton University School of Medicine
Bella Shaw Class of 1972. CNN Anchor, actress.

Footnotes

See also
 Lawton Public Schools
 Oklahoma State Department of Education

Public high schools in Oklahoma
Lawton, Oklahoma
Educational institutions established in 1962
Schools in Comanche County, Oklahoma
1962 establishments in Oklahoma